Dillwynella modesta is a species of sea snail, a marine gastropod mollusk in the family Skeneidae.

Description
The height of the shell attains 3 mm, its diameter 4 mm. The smooth, whitish shell is covered with an extremely thin epidermis which rises in microscopic blisters. The rounded, depressed spire has a distinct suture. It consists of three or four whorls. The sculpture shows faint lines of growth except on the base where a single rounded riblet or carina bounds a somewhat concave lunate space outside of the
polished columella. The thin, sharp outer lip has a moderate callus on the body. The thick columella is polished. The translucent operculum is yellowish and contains about five turns. The rounded aperture has a slight angle behind.

Distribution
This marine species occurs off St Lucia, Caribbean Sea, at depths between 413 m and 805 m; in the Atlantic Ocean off southeastern Brazil.

References

External links
 To World Register of Marine Species

modesta
Gastropods described in 1889